National Secondary Route 216, or just Route 216 (or ) is a National Road Route of Costa Rica, located in the San José province.

Description
In San José province the route covers Goicoechea canton (Ipís district), Vázquez de Coronado canton (San Isidro, San Rafael, Cascajal districts).

References

Highways in Costa Rica